Dipsacus is a genus of flowering plant in the family Caprifoliaceae. The members of this genus are known as teasel, teazel or teazle. Dipsacus species are native to Europe, Asia and northern Africa.

Etymology

The genus name (Dipsacus) is derived from the Greek word for thirst (dipsa) and refers to the cup-like formation made where sessile leaves merge at the stem.

The name teasel derives from words such as Old English tǣsl, tǣsel; relating to the verb "to tease" – the dried heads of the plant were once used in the textile industry to raise the nap on woolen cloth.

Description

Teasels are easily identified with their prickly stem and leaves, and the inflorescence of purple, dark pink, lavender or white flowers that form a head on the end of the stem(s). The first flowers begin opening in a belt around the middle of the spherical or oval flowerhead, and then open sequentially toward the top and bottom, forming two narrow belts as the flowering progresses. The dried head persists afterwards, with the small seeds maturing in mid autumn. In rainy weather, some seeds may germinate when still in the seedhead (vivipary).

Carnivory
Rain water can collect in the cup-like receptacles that form where sessile leaves join the stem; this structure may perform the function of preventing sap-sucking insects such as aphids from climbing the stem. Carnivory in teasels was discussed by Francis Darwin (son of Charles Darwin) in a paper held by the Royal Society. Contemporary attempts to replicate Darwin's experiments on the common teasel continue to fuel debate over whether or not Dipsacus is truly carnivorous. A 2011 study revealed increased seed production (but not height) dependent on both amount and nature of introduced animal supplementation, while 2019 experiments suggested that the increased seed set was a response to poor soil conditions rather than proof of proto-carnivory.

As food
The seeds are an important winter food resource for some birds, notably the European goldfinch. Teasels are often grown in gardens and encouraged on some nature reserves to attract them.

As an invasive species

Teasel is considered an invasive species in the United States. It is known to form a monoculture, capable of crowding out all native plant species, and therefore is discouraged or eliminated within restored open lands and other conservation areas. Two moths useful for biological control were tested in Slovakia in 2003–2004, including the monophagous Endothenia gentianaeana, but the USDA has not approved either of them for introduction as of February 2018. Instead, the USDA continues to suggest the use of herbicidal chemicals.

Species 
Selected Dipsacus species:

 Dipsacus ferox – spiny teasel
 Dipsacus fullonum – wild teasel, common teasel, fuller's teasel
 Dipsacus japonica – Japanese teasel, Chinese teasel
 Dipsacus laciniatus – cut-leaved teasel
 Dipsacus pilosus – small teasel
 Dipsacus sativus – fuller's teasel (cultivated form)
 Dipsacus strigosus – slim teasel
 etc.

Cultivation and uses

Fuller's teasel (the cultivar group Dipsacus fullonum Sativus Group; syn. D. sativus) historically saw wide use in textile processing, providing a natural comb for cleaning, aligning and raising the nap on fabrics, particularly wool. The product of the teasing process is called teased wool. The cultivar differs from the wild type in having stouter, somewhat recurved spines on the seed heads. The dried flower heads were attached to spindles, wheels, or cylinders, sometimes called teasel frames, to raise the nap on fabrics (that is, to tease the fibres). By the 20th century, teasels had been largely replaced by metal cards, which can be made uniformly and do not require constant replacement as the teasel heads wear. However, some people who weave wool still prefer to use teasels for raising the nap, claiming that the result is better; in particular, if a teasel meets serious resistance in the fabric, it will break, whereas a metal tool will rip the cloth.

Teasels are also occasionally grown as ornamental plants, and the dried heads are used in floristry.

Teasels have been naturalised in many regions away from their native range, partly due to the import of fuller's teasel for textile processing, and partly by the seed being a contaminant mixed with crop seeds.

Common teasel (Dipsacus fullonum) and cut-leaved teasel (Dipsacus laciniatus) have both been observed as invasive species in the United States. Common is more widespread, but cut-leaved is more aggressive.

Due to the chemical dipsacus saponin C, Dipsacus asper has medically significant procoagulant properties, likely due to an increase of intracellular calcium, and apoptosis of mitochondria. This presents a considerable risk to the average user but may be beneficial in certain circumstances.

Phytochemistry 
Ethanol extracts of Dipsacus asper contain phenolic acids including caffeic acid, 2,6-dihydroxycinnamic acid, vanillic acid, 2′-O-caffeoyl-D-glucopyranoside ester, and caffeoylquinic acid, iridoid glucosides, triterpenoids oleanic acid and akebiasaponin D.

References

External links 
 

Caprifoliaceae
Caprifoliaceae genera